Neath Canal Side railway station served the town of Neath, in the historical county of Glamorganshire, Wales, from 1895 to 1935 on the Rhondda and Swansea Bay Railway.

History 
The station was opened as Neath Canal Side on 14 March 1895 by the Rhondda and Swansea Bay Railway. Its name was changed to Neath Canal Bridge on 1 July 1924 but changed back to Neath Canal Side on 17 September 1926. The station closed on 16 September 1935.

References

External links 

Disused railway stations in Neath Port Talbot
Former Great Western Railway stations
Railway stations in Great Britain opened in 1895
Railway stations in Great Britain closed in 1935
1895 establishments in Wales
1935 disestablishments in Wales